The Lithuanian National Badminton Championships is a tournament organized to crown the best badminton players in Lithuania. They are held since 1963. Organised by Lithuanian Badminton Federation.

Past winners

References
Badminton Europe - Details of affiliated national organisations
Lietuvos badmintono federacija yearbook

External links 
 Lithuanian Badminton Federation Homepage

Recurring sporting events established in 1963
Annual sporting events in Lithuania
1963 establishments in Lithuania
National championships in Lithuania
Badminton tournaments in Lithuania